Marco Island Airways is a defunct airline based in Miami, Florida, United States.

History 
Marco Island Airways was formed in 1972 and commenced scheduled flights in 1973 from Miami International Airport, with a maintenance base at Opa Locka Airport on the western outskirts of Miami. Initial scheduled services were flown between Miami and Marco Island on Florida's Gulf Coast. Services were added to Tampa in 1980 and to Lakeland, Florida in 1981.

The airline also operated contract flights, as Air Florida Commuter, but retaining the Marco Island color scheme, in the early 1980s with service to Key West and the Bahamas. The airline was acquired by Provincetown-Boston Airline (PBA) in 1984 and its operations were fully merged into PBA during June 1986.

Fleet 

The Marco Island Airways fleet initially  consisted of six Martin 4-0-4 twin-engine pressurized piston-engine 44-seat airliners (shown in heading image), five examples being operated as at March 1985.  Three of the smaller twin turboprop Beech 99 (N1921T, N1922T, N1923T) were included in the fleet in 1973. Four Piper PA-31 Navajo eight-seat airliner was also operated in the early 1980s.

See also 
 List of defunct airlines of the United States

References

Bibliography 
 Killion, S.D., The Martinliners, Airways International Inc, 1997, 
 Wilkinson, D., Airline Fleets 1985, Air-Britain (Historians) Ltd, 1985,

External links 

Defunct companies based in Florida
Defunct airlines of the United States
Airlines established in 1972
1972 establishments in Florida
Airlines disestablished in 1986
1986 disestablishments in Florida
Transportation in Miami